The 1949–50 NBA season was the fourth season of the Washington Capitols in the National Basketball Association (NBA).

NBA Draft

Roster

|-
! colspan="2" style="background-color: #FFFFFF;  color: #008040; text-align: center;" | Washington Capitols 1949–50 roster
|- style="background-color: #008040; color: #FFFFFF;   text-align: center;"
! Players !! Coaches
|- 
| valign="top" |

! Pos. !! # !! Nat. !! Name !! Ht. !! Wt. !! From
|-

Regular season

Season standings

Record vs. opponents

Game log

Playoffs

East Division Semifinals
(2) New York Knicks vs. (3) Washington Capitols: Knicks win series 2-0
Game 1 @ Washington (March 21): New York 90, Washington 87
Game 2 @ New York (March 22): New York 103, Washington 83

Last playoff meeting: 1949 Eastern Division Finals (Washington won 2-1)

References

Washington Capitols seasons
Washington